Reginald Jackson may refer to:
Reginald Jackson (bishop) (born 1954), American religious leader in the African Methodist Episcopal Church
Reginald Jackson (politician) (1897–1969), Australian politician
 Reg Jackson (1913–1989), Australian police officer, 15th Chief Commissioner of Victoria Police
 Reginald Jackson (actor) (fl. 1940–1950), played in Indian film Mayurpankh
 Reggie Jackson (Reginald Martinez Jackson, born 1946), American baseball player
 Reginald Jackson, American player for  FC do Porto in 2012 Supertaça Compal Squads

See also
 Reggie Jackson (disambiguation)